The Zerzer Tal is a side valley of the Vinschgau in South Tyrol, Italy.

References 
Alpenverein South Tyrol 

Valleys of South Tyrol